The North Fork Crooked River is a tributary,  long, of the Crooked River in the U.S. state of Oregon. Beginning in the Ochoco National Forest and the Ochoco Mountains east of Prineville, it flows north, then east, then south-southwest to meet the larger stream between Post and Paulina.

In 1988, Congress added a large fraction of the river to the National Wild and Scenic Rivers System. About  were designated "wild", about  "scenic", and about  "recreational". About  of the upper river flowing through Big Summit Prairie was excluded from the Wild Rivers designation. It is private land used as livestock pasture.

See also
 List of National Wild and Scenic Rivers
 List of rivers of Oregon

References

Rivers of Crook County, Oregon
Rivers of Oregon
Wild and Scenic Rivers of the United States